Campeonato Nacional de Juniores B/Juvenis is the top level of the Portuguese football league system for youth players 17-year-old and under. It is administrated by the Portuguese Football Federation. The league started in 1962 and has been historically dominated by the Big Three clubs.

Format
The Campeonato Nacional de Juvenis begins in mid-August and ends in June. The Nacional de Juvenis season is played in three phases. In the first phase there are four regional groups of twelve teams. The top four teams of each group qualify to one of two the second phase Apuramento de Campeão groups. There are two groups composed of eight teams, North and South. The top two teams and best third placed team qualify directly to the third phase while the second best third placed team and best fourth placed team play a third phase Apuramento league with the Azores and Madeira regional champions, with the top team qualifying to the third phase. The bottom 8 teams of each first phase group move into four different Apuramento de Manutenção/Descida leagues with the bottom four being relegated to the regional leagues. The third phase is a single group of six teams that face each other to determine the champion.

Winners

Performance by club

Notes

References

Football leagues in Portugal
Recurring sporting events established in 1962
1962 establishments in Portugal